Khamiso Goth is a Union Council in the Karachi Central district of Karachi, Pakistan. It is administering as part of New Karachi Town, which was disbanded in 2011.
It is Located Near Liyari river.

There are several ethnic groups in Khamiso Goth including Muhajirs, Sindhis, Kashmiris, Seraikis, Pakhtuns, Balochis, Memons etc.

References

External links 
 Karachi Website

Neighbourhoods of Karachi
New Karachi Town